The Palacio Peñarol Contador Gastón Guelfi, commonly known as Palacio Peñarol, is an indoor sporting arena that is located in Montevideo, Uruguay. After the closure of the Cilindro Municipal in 2010, it is the main indoor arena in the country. It is mainly used to host basketball games. The arena's seating capacity for basketball games is 4,700. 

It was one of the host arenas for the 2017 FIBA AmeriCup, the official Americas Basketball Championship.

The arena also contains the club museum and club offices for Club Atlético Peñarol.

History

Palacio Contador Gastón Guelfi was originally opened in 1955. In 1994  The Ramones performed there. The arena was renovated in 2010 and 2011. The arena was used as a host venue of the 2017 FIBA AmeriCup.

Group C

All times are local (UTC−3).

References

External links
Interior Image of Palacio Contador Gastón Guelfi

Basketball venues in Uruguay
Buildings and structures in Montevideo
Indoor arenas in Uruguay
Sport in Montevideo
Sports venues completed in 1955
Sports venues in Uruguay
1955 establishments in Uruguay